The 1948 New Year Honours in New Zealand were appointments by King George VI on the advice of the New Zealand government to various orders and honours to reward and highlight good works by New Zealanders, and to celebrate the passing of 1947 and the beginning of 1948. They were announced on 1 January 1948.

The recipients of honours are displayed here as they were styled before their new honour.

Knight Bachelor
 The Honourable David Stanley Smith – judge of the Supreme Court, and chancellor of the University of New Zealand.

Order of Saint Michael and Saint George

Companion (CMG)
 The Right Reverend Frederick Augustus Bennett – of Kohupatiki; Bishop of Aotearoa. For services to the Māori people.
 Dr Guy Hardy Scholefield   – of Wellington; parliamentary librarian and Dominion archivist.

Order of the British Empire

Knight Commander (KBE)
Civil division
 Joseph Bernard Dawson  – professor of midwifery and gynaecology, University of Otago.

Commander (CBE)
Civil division
 Robert Caughley – of Wellington; formerly general manager of the Alliance Assurance Company in New Zealand. For public services.
 Walter Allison Gilmour  – of Auckland; pathologist, Auckland Public Hospital.
 John Henderson – of Wellington; formerly director, New Zealand Geological Survey.

Military division
 Group Captain Cyril Eyton Kay   – Royal New Zealand Air Force.

Officer (OBE)
Civil division
 John Barr – of Auckland; chief librarian and director, Public Library, Art Gallery and Old Colonists' Museum, Auckland.
 John Alexander Crawford – of Cairo. For services to the New Zealand Forces in Egypt, 1939–1945.
 Kanapu Haerehuka – of Wanganui. For social welfare services.
 Aileen Annie Joyce – of Auckland; matron, St Helen's Hospital, Auckland.
 Thomas Rowley Lees – of Palmerston North; a member of the National Rehabilitation Council and chairman of the Palmerston North Rehabilitation Committee.
 Mary Letitia Lindsay – of Timaru; matron, Timaru Public Hospital.
 James Murphy – of Christchurch; Dominion vice-president of the Disabled Servicemen's League and president of its Canterbury branch.
 Henry Valder – of Hamilton. For services in promoting industrial relations.
 Wilfred Stanley Wallis  – of Rotorua. For services to returned ex-servicemen.
 John Wilson – of Dunedin; a member of the Dunedin City Council for many years.

Military division
 Colonel (temporary) Charles Ritchie Burns – 2nd New Zealand Expeditionary Force.
 Lieutenant-Colonel (temporary) John Patrick Joyce  – Royal New Zealand Artillery.
 Squadron Leader Noel Alfred Vear – Royal New Zealand Air Force.

Member (MBE)
Civil division
 Ada Emily Beer – of Gisborne. For patriotic services.
 John Bryce Berry – of Kaikohe. For social welfare services in Northland.
 Pansy Helen Auld Chapman – of Auckland; charge nurse, Auckland Plunket Rooms.
 William Alfred Henry Corfield – of Auckland; constructive manager, His Majesty's New Zealand Dockyard, Auckland.
 Dorothy Louisa Derig – of Auckland. For patriotic and social welfare services.
 John William Fenton – of Kaitangata; formerly mayor of Kaitangata.
 Elsie Louisa Muriel Julius – of Greymouth; sister in charge, maternity annex, Greymouth.
 Kenneth McKenzie – of Geraldine; formerly chairman, Geraldine County Council.
 The Reverend Leslie Bourneman Neale – of Dunedin; formerly president of the Methodist Church of New Zealand, superintendent of the Dunedin Central Mission.
 James Baxter O'Neill – secretary, New Zealand Swimming Association.
 Mirika Wehipeihana – of Ōpunake; district health nurse.
 William Trickey Woods – of Christchurch. For services to ex-servicemen.

Military division
 Acting Telegraphist Lieutenant William Lewis Brewer  – Royal New Zealand Navy.
 Lieutenant-Colonel (temporary) John William Barry – New Zealand Regiment.
 Major and Quartermaster Thomas Joseph Cronin – New Zealand Regular Force.
 Major Adam James Moore – New Zealand Regiment.
 Captain John Henry Leedham Trenwith – New Zealand Temporary Staff.
 Flying Officer Richard Langsford Brewer – Royal New Zealand Air Force.
 Warrant Officer Albert Ernest Chapman – Royal New Zealand Air Force.

British Empire Medal (BEM)
Military division
 Electrical Artificer, Fourth Class, Alfred Ernest Crooks – Royal New Zealand Navy.
 Ernest Robert Jackson – canteen tenant, Royal New Zealand Navy.
 Private (temporary Warrant Officer Class I) Donald Hughes Cross – New Zealand Regiment.
 Private (temporary Warrant Officer Class I) David Charles McGill – New Zealand Temporary Staff.
 Private (temporary Staff-Sergeant) Victor James Keane – New Zealand Temporary Staff.
 Flight Sergeant James Robert John Begg – Royal New Zealand Air Force.
 Flight Sergeant Tom Lewis Dimmock – Royal New Zealand Air Force.
 Flight Sergeant William Henry James – Royal New Zealand Air Force.
 Flight Sergeant Basil Frederick White – Royal New Zealand Air Force.

Air Force Cross (AFC)
 Squadron Leader Cyril Henry Baigent   – Royal New Zealand Air Force. 
 Warrant Officer Douglas Owen Holloway – Royal New Zealand Air Force.
 Flight Lieutenant Alexander McLeod Morgan Thomas – Royal New Zealand Air Force.
 Flight Lieutenant Mervyn Windsor Wrennall – Royal New Zealand Air Force.

King's Commendation for Valuable Service in the Air
 Flying Officer John Duncan Garrett – Royal New Zealand Air Force.
 Warrant Officer Frederick Hazel – Royal New Zealand Air Force.
 Flying Officer Joseph Cassidy Naera – Royal New Zealand Air Force.
 Flight Lieutenant James Patrick O'Donnell – Royal New Zealand Air Force.
 Flight Sergeant Leslie Gordon Woods – Royal New Zealand Air Force.

References

New Year Honours
1948 awards
1948 in New Zealand
New Zealand awards